Jeffrey Manning (died February 13, 2004) was a county prosecutor and a member of the Ohio House of Representatives.

Manning was born in Elyria, Ohio. He earned a bachelor's degree from Kent State University and a PhD from the University of Akron.

He was appointed to be Lorain County, Ohio prosecutor to succeed Gregory White, who left to become United States Attorney for Northern Ohio. Manning died of complications of a heart condition in 2004. His wife, Gayle Manning, is currently (2010) a candidate for the Ohio Senate in district 13.

References

Republican Party members of the Ohio House of Representatives
2004 deaths
21st-century American politicians
1949 births